Adam English (born 2003) is an Irish hurler who plays for Limerick Senior Championship club Doon and at inter-county level with the Limerick senior hurling team. He usually lines out as a forward.

Career

English first played hurling at juvenile and underage levels with the Doon club. After several successes in the under-21 grade, he progressed onto the club's senior team. English first appeared on the inter-county scene during a two-year stint with the Limerick minor hurling team. He won consecutive Munster MHC titles, including one as team captain, before later lining out with the under-20 team. English made his Limerick senior hurling team competitive debut during the 2022 National Hurling League.

Career statistics

Honours

Doon
Limerick Under-21 Hurling Championship: 2020, 2021

Limerick
Munster Hurling Cup: 2022
Munster Under-20 Hurling Championship: 2022
Munster Minor Hurling Championship: 2019 (c), 2020

References

2003 births
Living people
Doon hurlers
Limerick inter-county hurlers